Czechoslovak Republic (Czech and Slovak: Československá republika, ČSR), was the official name of Czechoslovakia between 1918 and 1939 and between 1945 and 1960. See:

First Czechoslovak Republic (1918–1938)
Second Czechoslovak Republic (1938–1939)
Czechoslovak government-in-exile (1939–1945)
Third Czechoslovak Republic (1945–1948)
Socialist Czechoslovakia (1948–1960)

Czechoslovakia